Mathikere Sampige Ramaiah (Kannada: ಎಂ. ಎಸ್. ರಾಮಯ್ಯ; 20 April 1922 – 25 December 1997) was a renowned educationist, philanthropist, infrastructure visionary, industrialist, and a pioneer in creating several landmark infrastructure projects in India.

Early life 

Mathikere Sampangi Ramaiah was born on 20 April 1922, in Madhugiri to Sampangappa and Narasamma. He completed his primary education in Mathikere, which was then in the outskirts of Bangalore city and then moved on to agriculture due to paucity of funds. Later he went to work for the Indian Railways for a span of about two years.

He then ventured into the job of a contractor and started off as a supplier of bricks for military camps in Bangalore during World War II. His immense success in the field of civil works was marked by the construction of some of the major projects in the state, such as the canals of the Ghataprabha Project, Talakalale Dam and also the Dharma Project.

Achievements

MSR Group of Institutions 

In 1962, Ramaiah established the Gokula Education Foundation, which marked the beginning of the Ramaiah Institute of Technology (MSRIT, Bangalore). In 1979, the M.S. Ramaiah Medical College was set up and as a requisite for medical education, the M.S. Ramaiah Teaching Hospital was founded. With a vision of a multi-specialty center, the M.S. Ramaiah Institute of Nephrourology, M.S. Ramaiah Institute of Oncology and M.S. Ramaiah Institute of Cardiology was set up; the founding of M.S. Ramaiah Medical Teaching Hospital in 1985 added on to his list of milestones.

Institutions founded by M.S. Ramaiah:
 1962: M. S. Ramaiah Institute of Technology
 1979: M.S. Ramaiah Medical College
 1985: M.S. Ramaiah Medical Teaching Hospital
 1987: M.S. Ramaiah Institute of Nursing Education & Research
 1991: M.S. Ramaiah Dental College
 1992: M.S. Ramaiah College of Pharmacy; M.S. Ramaiah Institute of Hotel Management
 1993: M.S. Ramaiah Composite Junior College
 1994: M.S. Ramaiah College of Arts, Science & Commerce; M.S. Ramaiah Vidhyaniketan
 1995: M. S. Ramaiah Institute of Management
 1996: M.S. Ramaiah Institute of Physical Medicine & Rehabilitation; PG Course in Nursing [MSc (N)]
 1997: M.S. Ramaiah Polytechnic
 1999: M.S. Ramaiah School of Advanced Studies, now M S Ramaiah University of Applied Sciences
 2004: M.S. Ramaiah College of Education
 2006: M.S. Ramaiah International Medical School
 2012: M.S. Ramaiah Advanced Learning Center; M.S. Ramaiah Institute of Neurosciences; M.S. Ramaiah Clinical Research Centre
 2013: M S Ramaiah University of Applied Sciences

Religion 

In his heart, Ramaiah had always been a deeply religious man and has left an indelible mark in all his activities as the President of Karnataka’s ancient shrine ‘Kaiwara. In renovating the Ashram of Yogi Nareyana Yatindra, the space provided sanctity to a huge number of devotees along with the provision of free food everyday. In addition, he organised for the giving away of alms at religious congregations, particularly ‘Sadhu Sangama’.

Industrialisation 
With M Vishweswariah as a role model, Ramaiah believed in industrialization and was its pioneer too. Some of the industries he promoted include:
 Kvaerner John Brown (India) Pvt. Ltd
 M. S. R. & Sons Investments Ltd
 Indo-Malaysian Technopolis Pvt. Ltd
 M. S. Ramaiah Investments and Properties Ltd

Journalism 

Being a multi-faceted personality with a political opinion, Ramaiah developed a deep interest in Journalism. In 1956, he acquired the Thainadu daily, the then oldest Kannada daily in Mysore State and not only led for it to thrive, but he also started Gokula a Kannada weekly and Kailasa a monthly. These became a herald of a neo-tri-colour nationalist era and are considered as model publications even today.

Humanitarian and philanthropic initiatives 

The setting up of M. S. Ramaiah Charities Trust led to the assistance of impecunious and meritorious students to pursue a bright career. This trust provides a scholarship of around 25 lakhs to exemplary and backward class students annually. It also supports scholarships for candidates appearing for civil service exams such as the IAS and IPS.

Realising the importance of development in any society, he was responsible for the construction of housing facilities for poor and middle-class families to live at reasonable and affordable prices. Earlier a suburb, the locality has now turned into a modern downtown of a quarter million population.

Being the Chairman of the Reception Committee, he organised the Kannada Sahithya Sammelana at Kaiwara in the year 1990. This hosted the perfect suburban setting for the neoteric and literary minds of Kannada literature to convene and was considered one of the best meets held in the recent past.

Honours and awards 

• Doctor of Letters, Honoris Causa, Tumkur University, posthumous
• Doctor of Science, Visvesvaraya Technological University, Belgaum, posthumous

References

External links 

 M. S. Ramaiah Official Website

1922 births
1997 deaths
Kannada people
Businesspeople from Bangalore
20th-century Indian philanthropists